Chambellan is a commune in the Jérémie Arrondissement, in the Grand'Anse department of Haiti. It has 16,883 inhabitants.

Villages located within the commune include: Babino, Cadette, Grande Plaine, Granger, La Coude and Laterriere.

References

Populated places in Grand'Anse (department)
Communes of Haiti